Founded in 2007, Campus Explorer, Inc., helps higher education institutions recruit and enroll students. The company was the recipient of the Deloitte Fast 500 (seventh-fastest-growing Internet company in the U.S.) for their work in bringing innovative recruitment products and services to the higher-education industry. In November of 2018, Campus Explorer announced its corporate rebrand to Archer Education.  

Early Funding

In the Summer of 2007, Campus Explorer raised a $1.65 million Series A investment from Rincon Venture Partners and O’Connor Ventures. In the first quarter of 2009, Campus Explorer reached more than 1 million visitors, which was up 55% from the end of 2008, setting the stage for $2.25 million in a Series B funding round led by investors OCA Ventures, Origin Ventures and Rincon Venture Partners. In 2010, Campus Explorer raised $5 million in a Series C funding round. The funding came from investors Vicente Capital Partners, OCA Ventures and Origin Ventures.

Acclaim

In 2011, the Los Angeles winners of the Deloitte Fast 500 list of fastest-growing companies were announced, and Campus Explorer was awarded the "Technology Rising Stars" award with 1,497% revenue growth.

By 2013, Campus Explorer ranked the seventh fastest-growing Internet company in the United States. Campus Explorer grew 5,636% between 2008 and 2012.

References

Companies based in Santa Monica, California
Educational technology companies of the United States
Higher education in the United States